The Singapore Buddhist Lodge (SBL)  is a lay Buddhist and charitable organization in Singapore. Founded in 1934, it is one of the oldest charities in Singapore.

History
The Singapore Buddhist Lodge was founded by around 100 philanthropists, members of Singapore society. A building at 26 Blair Road and around S$1,000 cash were donated by Lee Choon Seng. Membership increased to 2,000 patrons by 1946. The charity began renting premises at 17 Kim Yam Road. The building was purchased outright in 1950, with a donation of S$10,000 from Zhang Jiamei and Zhong Tianshui and money obtained in a fundraising drive.

See also
 Buddhism in Singapore
 List of Buddhist temples in Singapore
 List of voluntary welfare organisations in Singapore
 Zhuan Dao

References

News articles

External links
 

History of Singapore
1934 establishments in Singapore